Thomas Muster was the defending champion, but lost in the second round to Nicolas Kiefer.

Àlex Corretja won the title, defeating Félix Mantilla 7–6(7–0), 6–1 in the final.

Seeds

Draw

Finals

Top half

Bottom half

References

 Main Draw

1998 Dubai Tennis Championships
1998 ATP Tour